|}

The Kingwell Hurdle is a Grade 2 National Hunt hurdle race in Great Britain which is open to horses aged four years or older. It is run at Wincanton over a distance of about 2 miles (1 mile, 7 furlongs and 65 yards, or 
), and during its running there are eight hurdles to be jumped. The race is scheduled to take place each year in February.

The race was first run in 1971 and was awarded Grade 2 status in 1991.

The event serves as an important trial for the Champion Hurdle in March. Several horses have won both races in the same year, and the most recent to achieve this was Katchit in 2008.

Winners
 Amateur jockeys indicated by "Mr".

 The race was abandoned in 1985 because of snow and frost, and in 1986 because of frost.

 The race was abandoned in 1996 because of snow and frost.

 The 2010 running was cancelled due to frost.

See also
 Horseracing in Great Britain
 List of British National Hunt races

References
 Racing Post:
 
 pedigreequery.com – Kingwell Hurdle – Wincanton.

External links
 Race Recordings 

National Hunt races in Great Britain
Wincanton Racecourse
National Hunt hurdle races
Recurring sporting events established in 1971
1971 establishments in England